Open heart may refer to:

 Open-heart surgery, any kind of surgery in which a surgeon makes a large incision in the chest to open the rib cage and operate on the heart
 Open Heart (journal), an online open access journal publishing research into cardiology
 Open Heart (2007 film), a 2007 short documentary film about Palestinian healthcare
 Open Heart (2012 film), a 2012 short documentary film about Rwandan children
 Open Heart (TV series), a 2015 television series

See also
 An Open Heart (disambiguation)
 Open Hearts, a 2002 Danish drama film